Two ships of the Royal Navy have been named HMS Petunia :

  an  sloop launched in 1916 and sold in 1922
  a  launched in 1940 and transferred to the Republic of China Navy as Fu Po in 1946; she was sunk in the following year

Royal Navy ship names